Andrew Wojtanik (born 1989) was the winner of the National Geographic Bee hosted by Alex Trebek in 2004, and the National Geographic World Championship in 2005. To get to the National Geographic Bee finals, he survived two tiebreakers to advance to the final round against 13-year-old Matthew Wells of Montana, beating him to win a $25,000 scholarship. He credits his success to a 384-page book he compiled, which is now an official study guide for the Bee, called "Afghanistan to Zimbabwe: Country Facts That Helped Me Win the National Geographic Bee", which was published in 2004. A second edition, "The National Geographic Bee Ultimate Fact Book: Countries A to Z", was published in 2011. Andrew lived in Overland Park, Kansas and in 2008 graduated from Blue Valley West High School. His family has since moved to Florida.

He attended Georgetown University, majoring in International Politics. There, he served as events director for the Georgetown College Democrats and was active in many other campus organizations. He now works for the Harvard Kennedy School as a research assistant.

Publications

Afghanistan to Zimbabwe, by Andrew Wojtanik

References

Kansas 8th Grader Wins National Geographic Bee, by Sarah Ives

1989 births
Living people
Writers from Kansas
National Geographic Bee